Tamás Lőrincz (born 20 December 1986) is a Hungarian wrestler. He won the silver medal at the 2012 Summer Olympics in the Greco-Roman 66 kg event and a gold medal in the men's 77 kg event at the 2020 Summer Olympics held in Tokyo, Japan.

References

External links 

 
 
 

1986 births
Living people
Hungarian male sport wrestlers
Olympic wrestlers of Hungary
Wrestlers at the 2008 Summer Olympics
Wrestlers at the 2012 Summer Olympics
Wrestlers at the 2016 Summer Olympics
Wrestlers at the 2020 Summer Olympics
Olympic gold medalists for Hungary
Olympic silver medalists for Hungary
Olympic medalists in wrestling
Medalists at the 2012 Summer Olympics
World Wrestling Championships medalists
Wrestlers at the 2019 European Games
European Games medalists in wrestling
European Games bronze medalists for Hungary
European Wrestling Championships medalists
Medalists at the 2020 Summer Olympics
European Wrestling Champions
People from Cegléd
Sportspeople from Pest County
21st-century Hungarian people